Delta State is one of the 36 states of Nigeria with Asaba as the state capital. This list of tertiary institutions in Delta State includes universities, polytechnics and colleges that are owned by Federal Government, State Government and private individuals.

Universities 

 Federal University of Petroleum Resources Effurun
 Delta State University, Abraka
 Delta State University of Science and Technology, Ozoro
 Dennis Osadebay University, Asaba
 University of Delta, Agbor
 Western Delta University, Oghara
 Novena University, Ogume-Amai
 National Open University of Nigeria (three study centres, one at Asaba, one at Emevor and another at Owhrode).
 Edwin Clark University, Kiagbodo
 Eagle Heights University, Omadino, Warri
 Admiralty University of Nigeria at Ibusa and Sapele

Polytechnics 
 Bellmark Polytechnic, Kwale.
 Calvary Polytechnic, Owa-Oyibo, Delta State
 Delta State Polytechnic, Ogwashi-Uku
 Delta State Polytechnic, Oghara
 Delta State School of Marine Technology, Burutu.
 Delta State College Of Health Technology, Ofuoma
 Petroleum Training Institute, Effurun

Colleges 
 Federal College of Education (Technical), Asaba
 College of Education, Edjeba Road, Warri, Delta State
 Delta State College of Physical Education, Mosogar
 School of Midwifery, Asaba
 Conarina School of Maritime & Transport Technology, Oria-Abraka

References 

Delta